Alex Hernandez may refer to:

Alex Hernández (baseball) (born 1977), Puerto Rican former Major League Baseball player
Alex Hernández (tennis), Mexican tennis player
Alex Hernandez (writer) (born 1978), Cuban-American writer of indie webcomics
Alex R. Hernandez Jr. (born 1971), American lawyer
Alex Hernandez (actor) (born 1988), actor in the TV series Hemlock Grove
Alex Hernandez, Chilean-American death metal drummer with the bands Immolation and Requiem Aeternam